Ǹ, ǹ (n-grave) is a letter in the Yoruba language to place emphasis on the consonant, however this rarely occurs. It is also part of the digraph ǹg in Hokkien Pe̍h-ōe-jī, which is used as a syllabic voiced velar nasal in the third tone.

Character mappings

See also
Grave accent

N-grave